The Arakan Liberation Party (ALP) is a Rakhine political party in Myanmar (Burma). The party has an armed wing, the Arakan Liberation Army (ALA), which has 700–1,000 personnel. The ALA signed a ceasefire agreement with the government of Myanmar on 5 April 2012 and became a signatory of the Nationwide Ceasefire Agreement (NCA) on 15 October 2015.

History

1967–1969 
The Arakan Liberation Party was founded on 9 April 1967, along with its armed wing, the Arakan Liberation Army, with the help of the Karen National Union (KNU). On 26 November 1968, Khai Ray Khai, a member of the party's central committee, along with nine other associates, were arrested at Sittwe, the capital of Rakhine State, by Burmese authorities. On 20 December 1968 Khaing Soe Naing, the party's General Secretary, was arrested by Burmese authorities at Rathedaung Township, in Rakhine State. Following those arrests, several more ALP members were also arrested on different charges, and the party dissolved. The party has accused the government of torturing its imprisoned members.

1971–1977 
Between 1971 and 1972, former political prisoners from the ALP were released on amnesty. As soon as Khaing Moe Lunn, a former ALP member, was released, he departed to Komura to meet with KNU leaders in order to re-establish the ALP and ALA. From 1973 to 1974, the ALP was re-established with help from the KNU, and 300 fighters were recruited and trained by the ALA, with Khaing as the President of the ALP and Commander in Chief of the ALA. After a failed offensive by Khaing against both Indian and Burmese forces resulted in massive arrests of party members, the ALP ceased its activities once again.

1980–present 
In 1980, all ALP and ALA prisoners were released on amnesty. In 1981, the ALP and ALA were once again established, now under the leadership of Khai Ray Khai, and was once again assisted by the KNU. The ALP is presently allied with the KNU, along with the National Democratic Front (NDF), the Democratic Alliance of Burma (DAB), and the National Council of the Union of Burma (NCUB).

The ALP signed the Nationwide Ceasefire Agreement (NCA) on 15 October 2015, along with seven other insurgent groups.

See also 
 Arakan National Party
 Internal conflict in Myanmar

References

External links

1968 establishments in Burma
Ethnic political parties
Nationalist parties in Asia
Paramilitary organisations based in Myanmar
Political parties established in 1968
Political parties in Myanmar
Political parties of minorities
Rakhine State
Rebel groups in Myanmar